Gottfried Reinhold Treviranus (20 March 1891, in Schieder, Germany – 7 June 1971, in Florence, Italy) was a German politician from the Conservative People's Party and a Reichsminister in both of Chancellor Heinrich Brüning's cabinets. In the first he was Minister for the Occupied Territories (March – October 1930) and then Minister without Portfolio (October 1930 – October 1931); in the second (October 1931 – May 1932), he served as Minister of Transport.

Early life
Born in 1891, he was the son of a German father and a Scottish mother. After graduation in 1909, he became an officer in the Imperial German Navy from 1912 to 1919, holding the rank of lieutenant commander. After leaving the navy, he studied agriculture and in 1921 became director of the Chamber of Agriculture. He was married to Elisabeth Dryander, a travel writer.

Career

Party politician (1924 to 1930)
In 1924, Treviranus was elected for the German National People's Party (DNVP) to the Reichstag. From 1925 to 1929 he also was a member of the Landtag of the Free State of Lippe and served as the head of the DNVP's parliamentary group there. As a representative of the moderate wing of the DNVP he rejected the extreme right led by Alfred Hugenberg who became party president in 1928. In the summer of 1929, Treviranus together with Hans Schlange-Schöningen was one of two prominent DNVP Reichstag deputies who resigned from the party's caucus in protest against the Young Plan referendum bill which they called irresponsible in the extreme, to be joined shortly afterwards by the former chairman Kuno von Westarp and another 20 DNVP Reichstag members leaving the party and forming the more moderate Conservative People's Party (CPP).

Treviranus politically supported a center-right government coalition. His goal was to align the CPP coalition with the moderate right. The center-right alliance should conduct comprehensive reforms. With this objective, Treviranus had built close relationships and had good contacts.

Treviranus has played a significant role in the development of Brüning's government in March 1930. In December 1929, he had participated in preliminary discussions with Brüning, Kurt von Schleicher, Defence Minister Wilhelm Groener and President Hindenburg's head of office Otto Meissner, at the home of his national conservative party friend Friedrich Wilhelm Freiherr von Willisen. Hindenburg gave Brüning the task of forming a cabinet that would govern without the Social Democrats (SPD).

Government minister (1930 to 1932)

Treviranus' first position in the new government was as Minister for the Occupied Territories, i.e. those parts of the Rhineland under French and Belgian occupation. After the occupation forces were reduced following the Young Plan in June 1930 he became Minister without Portfolio and he liaised with industry for Hindenburg and Brüning.

Before the General Election of 1930, Treviranus, in co-operation with politically influential military leaders, tried to re-organise the party system. He negotiated forming a loose middle-class electoral alliance to secure a majority for Brüning. This was funded by generous donations from big business but it was not successful.

From 9 October 1931 to 30 May 1932 he served in Brüning's second cabinet as Minister of Transport.

The government adopted a right wing nationalist stance during election campaigns and also at cabinet meetings. When French Foreign Minister Aristide Briand submitted a plan for a European Union it was rejected by the entire cabinet, and Treviranus said that the plan was an attack on the current German foreign policy at that time. In cabinet meetings he pushed to get the Versailles Treaty revised.

As Reich Commissioner for Eastern Germany, he was not successful in saving the country from bankruptcy  and after this failure he resigned in August 1931.

The Brüning government went through a crisis in autumn 1931 with a worsening economic situation. Treviranus once again liaised between businesses and the government. On behalf of Brüning, he advised the major Ruhr industrialists Paul Reusch and Fritz Springorum not to collaborate with the National Socialists and German nationalists. However, the government fell when embarrassing documents about the behaviour of industry and the banks during the crisis came to light. In the parliamentary elections of 31 July 1932, Treviranus lost his seat as did his Conservative People's Party. Treviranus went into business; he became chairman of the Upper Silesian Bata shoe factory. His political career was over at the age of 41.

Escape and emigration
Although almost as much a nationalist as Adolf Hitler, Treviranus was well known for disliking the Nazi leader. He was also Brüning's close friend and influential with the military. On 30 June 1934, Treviranus escaped the Night of the Long Knives. While in exile, he recalled that after lunch, a large number of police and SS men entered his house. His father answered their request to see "Treviranus". Their target and his daughter were playing tennis in the garden when she cried out "front of house full of Nazis!" He got away by jumping over the garden fence, and climbed into his car which had the key already in the ignition and drove away at high speed. Five rifle shots missed.

The assassins followed Treviranus but could not shoot him because he drove into town. He borrowed street clothes from a friend, then went to Schleicher's home and asked an SS guard what was happening. Learning that Schleicher had been shot, Treviranus abandoned his car outside the city to pretend that he had escaped into the countryside, took a taxi back into Berlin, was hidden by friends, and helped into the Netherlands by the same person who had helped Brüning to flee.

After a few days' stay in the Netherlands, he went to Great Britain. He met many well-known politicians including Churchill and Anthony Eden, at whose behest, he was asked about the character of Hitler and the Nazi movement. He warned of Hitler's aggressive expansion plan. He was formally expatriated in 1939 by the German Reich and at the outbreak of war went to Canada where he worked as a farmer.

Later years (1945 to 1971)
After 1945, Treviranus advised the United States government on the allocation of loans to German companies as part of the Marshall Plan. In 1949, he returned to Germany. In the 1950s, his name became associated with a gambling scandal. In the 1960s, he worked as a defense lobbyist in the West German capital Bonn, where during this time he appeared in the investigative report on the HS-30 scandal. He had regular correspondence with the former Lippe state president Heinrich Drake from 1966 until his death.

He died on June 3, 1971 from heart failure during a stay in Florence.

References

External links
 

1891 births
1971 deaths
People from Lippe
German Protestants
German National People's Party politicians
Conservative People's Party (Germany) politicians
Weimar Republic politicians
Members of the Reichstag of the Weimar Republic